Shuixiang Xincheng (lit. Water Town New City) is a designated area for city planning of Dongguan, Guangdong province, China.

References 

 

County-level divisions of Guangdong
Geography of Dongguan